The Desert Green Solar Farm is a 8.8 MWp (6.3 MWAC) concentrator photovoltaics (CPV) power station in Borrego Springs, California.

It was built by Blattner Energy using 299 dual-axis CX-S530 systems, each of which contains 12 CX-M500 modules.  

Each module contains 2,400 fresnel lenses to concentrate sunlight 500 times onto multi-junction solar cells, allowing a greater efficiency than other photovoltaic power plants.

The output is being sold to San Diego Gas & Electric under a 25-year Power Purchase Agreement.

Electricity production

See also

 Touwsrivier CPV Solar Project
 Newberry Springs CPV Power Plant
 Solar power in California
 Solar power in the United States
 Renewable portfolio standard

References

External links
 RRC Power & Energy Surveying International - Desert Green Solar Field
 Helix Environmental Planning - Desert Green Solar Project

Photovoltaic power stations in the United States
Solar power stations in California
Solar power in the Mojave Desert